Brotherton is a village and civil parish in North Yorkshire, England.

Brotherton may also refer to:

Brotherton (surname)
Brotherton Farm, a farm complex in Pennsylvania, United States
Brotherton Library, a building at the University of Leeds, England
Name of the first Indian reservation in America, now known as Indian Mills, New Jersey